The Secret: Suster Ngesot Urban Legend is an Indonesian horror film released in 2019. The film was directed by Arie Azis, and stars Nagita Slavina, Marshanda, Kanaya Gleadys, and Raffi Ahmad. The film is a complete and continuing story of the novel of the same name released on February 9, 2018. Utopia's song 'Antara Ada dan Tiada' was chosen as the soundtrack for the film, and was sung by Nagita Slavina and Marshanda.

The film was released on April 26, 2018.

Plot 
Returning from studying in Melbourne, Australia, Kanaya (Nagita Slavina) is surprised to find out that her father (Roy Marten) has married a woman named Sofie (Tyas Mirasih) 2 months prior of her return. Sofie turns out to be the same age as Kanaya as well. She decides to leave, but soon has an accident that results in being taken to a haunted hospital for treatment. From there, Kanaya begins to be terrorized by Suster Ngesot. With the onset of family conflicts and the terror of Suster Ngesot, Kanaya becomes depressed..

Cast

Main Character 

 Nagita Slavina  as Kanaya, a girl who returns home from abroad to find her father has remarried. This brings on a barrage of problems for Kanaya.
 Raffi Ahmad as Teddy, Kanaya's ex-boyfriend, who still cares about her. After seeing Kanaya in trouble, he tries to help.
 Kanaya Gleadys as Kemala, an indigo child who is considered strange by others but becomes Kanaya's best friend.
 Marshanda as Suster Maryam/Marsha, Kemala's home schooling teacher, and Kanaya's close friend.
 Roy Marten  as Ridwan, Kanaya's father.
 Tyas Mirasih as Sofie, Ridwan's young wife, the same age as Kanaya.
 Kartika Putri as Putri, Kemala's yoga-trainer mother.
 Wika Salim as Suster Asih, a beautiful junior nurse at the hospital where Kanaya is treated.
 Lia Waode as Suster Yoyom, a nurse who works at the hospital where Kanaya is treated.
 Merry Sadili as Dudung
 Farida Pasha as Nenek
 Nisya Ahmad as Mama Kanaya
 Mikaela Atqia Rosadi as Kemala Kecil
 Mongol Stres as Mantri Ismet
  as Dokter Bertha
 Caisar Putra Aditya as Satpam
 Dede Sunandar as Paijo
 Nunung as Ibu Paijo
 Gisella Anastasia as Nicole

Theme Song
 Utopia's song 'Antara Ada dan Tiada' sung by Nagita Slavina and Marshanda.

References

2018 films
2018 horror films
Indonesian horror films
Remakes of Indonesian films
2010s Indonesian-language films
Horror film remakes